Abayima is a non-profit organization that was founded to support citizens when their voices are threatened in the form of attacks on communications infrastructure.

Abayima (the Luganda word for "Guardian") was inspired by the plight of activists in countries like Uganda, Libya, Syria, and Egypt where authorities have been known to sever (or monitor) citizen access to the internet and mobile communication. During these 'internet black-outs', Abayima provides solutions that allow citizens and journalists to communicate in spite of such measures. In 2011 the project was piloted by Jon Gosier and his colleagues when government authorities in Uganda began intercepting SMS messages, a popular means for communicating in developing countries during times of crisis.

Products

Open SIM Kit (OSK) is an open source software for editing the content of SIM cards. There are many different mobile phones and many different SIM cards on the market; the project attempts to solve this problem by offering an intuitive tool for modifying the contents of SIM cards.

Awards

Abayima was awarded $150,000 from the Knight Foundation in the 2013 Knight News Challenge. Previously, in 2011, the project received a £15,000 grant from Indigo Trust.

References

Human rights organisations based in Uganda
Organizations established in 2011